Luise, Princess of Anhalt-Pless (née Princess Maria Dorothea Henriette Luise of Schleswig-Holstein-Sonderburg-Beck; 28 September 1783 – 24 November 1803) was a member of the Danish royal family and, as the first wife of Frederick Ferdinand, Prince of Anhalt-Pless, the princess consort of Anhalt-Pless.

Biography  
Princess Maria Dorothea Henriette Luise of Schleswig-Holstein-Sonderburg-Beck was born in Lindenau on 28 September 1783 to Friedrich Karl Ludwig, Duke of Schleswig-Holstein-Sonderburg-Beck and Countess Friederike of Schlieben. Her mother was the daughter of Count Karl Leopold von Schlieben, who served as Minister of war in Prussia. As a male-line descendant of Christian III of Denmark, she was a princess of Denmark.

On 20 August 1803 she married Frederick Ferdinand, Prince of Anhalt-Pless in Lindenau, becoming the princess consort of Anhalt-Pless. She died three months later, on 24 November 1803, at Schloss Pless. Her husband later married Countess Julie of Brandenburg and became the Duke of Anhalt-Köthen.

References 

1783 births
1803 deaths
Consorts of Anhalt
Danish princesses
German princesses
House of Schleswig-Holstein-Sonderburg-Beck